IIM (Indian Institutes of Management) is a group of 20 schools of management in India.

IIM may also refer to:
IIM (Flans album)
Indian Institute of Metals, an Indian professional body
Institution of Industrial Managers, a UK professional body until 1992 
Institute of Interim Management, a UK professional body
IPTC Information Interchange Model, a standard for embedding metadata in images

See also
 Iim (biblical city)